Willy Richartz (1900–1972) was a German composer and conductor.

Selected filmography
 Sergeant Schwenke (1935)

References

Bibliography
 Lutz Peter Koepnick. The Dark Mirror: German Cinema Between Hitler and Hollywood. University of California Press, 2002.

External links

1900 births
1972 deaths
German composers
Musicians from Cologne
20th-century German musicians